This is a list of works published by Umberto Eco.

Novels

Il nome della rosa (1980; English translation: The Name of the Rose, 1983)
Il pendolo di Foucault (1988; English translation: Foucault's Pendulum, 1989)
L'isola del giorno prima (1994; English translation: The Island of the Day Before, 1995)
Baudolino (2000; English translation: Baudolino, 2001)
La misteriosa fiamma della regina Loana (2004; English translation: The Mysterious Flame of Queen Loana, 2005)
Il cimitero di Praga (2010; English translation: The Prague Cemetery, 2011)
Numero Zero (2015; English translation: Numero Zero, 2015)

Non-fiction books

Il problema estetico in San Tommaso (1956 – English translation: The Aesthetics of Thomas Aquinas, 1988, revised)
"Sviluppo dell'estetica medievale", in Momenti e problemi di storia dell'estetica (1959 – Art and Beauty in the Middle Ages, 1985)
Opera aperta (1962, rev. 1976 – English translation: The Open Work (1989)
Diario Minimo (1963 – English translation: Misreadings, 1993)
Apocalittici e integrati (1964 – Partial English translation: Apocalypse Postponed, 1994)
Le poetiche di Joyce (1965 – English translations: The Middle Ages of James Joyce, The Aesthetics of Chaosmos, 1989)
La Struttura Assente (1968 – The Absent Structure)
Il costume di casa (1973 – English translation: Faith in Fakes: Travels in Hyperreality, 1986)
Trattato di semiotica generale (1975 – English translation: A Theory of Semiotics, 1976)
Il Superuomo di massa (1976)
Come si fa una tesi di laurea (1977 - English translation: How to Write a Thesis, 2015)
Dalla periferia dell'impero (1977)
Lector in fabula (1979)
A semiotic Landscape. Panorama sémiotique. Proceedings of the Ist Congress of the International Association for Semiotic Studies, Den Haag, Paris, New York: Mouton (=Approaches to Semiotics, 29) (with Seymour Chatman and Jean-Marie Klinkenberg).
The Role of the Reader: Explorations in the Semiotics of Texts (1979 – English edition containing essays from Opera aperta, Apocalittici e integrati, Forme del contenuto (1971), Il Superuomo di massa, Lector in Fabula).
Sette anni di desiderio (1983)
Postille a il nome della rosa (1983 – US edition: Postscript to The Name of the Rose, 1984; UK edition: Reflections on The Name of the Rose, 1985)Semiotica e filosofia del linguaggio (1984 – English translation: Semiotics and the Philosophy of Language, 1984)De Bibliotheca (1986 – in Italian and French)Lo strano caso della Hanau 1609 (1989 – French translation: L'Enigme de l'Hanau 1609, 1990)I limiti dell'interpretazione (1990 – The Limits of Interpretation, 1990)Interpretation and Overinterpretation (1992 – with R. Rorty, J. Culler, C. Brooke-Rose; edited by S. Collini)Il secondo diario minimo (1992)La ricerca della lingua perfetta nella cultura europea (1993 – English translation: The Search for the Perfect Language (The Making of Europe), 1995)Six Walks in the Fictional Woods (1994)Incontro – Encounter – Rencontre (1996 – in Italian, English, French)In cosa crede chi non crede? (with Carlo Maria Martini), 1996 – English translation: Belief or Nonbelief?: A Dialogue, 2000)Cinque scritti morali (1997 – English translation: Five Moral Pieces, 2001)Kant e l'ornitorinco (1997 – English translation: Kant and the Platypus: Essays on Language and Cognition, 1999)Serendipities: Language and Lunacy (1998)How to Travel with a Salmon & Other Essays (1998 – Partial English translation of Il secondo diario minimo, 1994)La bustina di Minerva (1999)Experiences in Translation University of Toronto Press (2000)Sugli specchi e altri saggi (2002)Sulla letteratura (2003 – English translation by Martin McLaughlin: On Literature, 2004)Dire quasi la stessa cosa: esperienze di traduzione (2003), Milano, Bompiani, 2003, ISBN 88-452-5397-X.Mouse or Rat?: Translation as negotiation (2003)Storia della bellezza (2004, co-edited with Girolamo de Michele – English translation: History of Beauty/On Beauty, 2004)A passo di gambero. Guerre calde e populismo mediatico (Bompiani, 2006 – English translation: Turning Back the Clock: Hot Wars and Media Populism, 2007, Alastair McEwen)Storia della bruttezza (Bompiani, 2007 – English translation: On Ugliness, 2007)Dall'albero al labirinto: studi storici sul segno e l'interpretazione (Bompiani, 2007 – English translation: "From the Tree to the Labyrinth: Historical Studies on the Sign and Interpretation", 2014, Anthony Oldcorn)La Vertigine della Lista (Rizzoli, 2009) – English translation: The Infinity of ListsCostruire il nemico e altri scritti occasionali (Bompiani, 2011) – English translation by Richard Dixon: Inventing the Enemy (2012)Storia delle terre e dei luoghi leggendari (Bompiani, 2013) – English translation by Alastair McEwen: The Book of Legendary Lands (2013)
 Pape Satàn Aleppe: Cronache di una società liquida (Nave di Teseo, 2016) – English translation by Richard Dixon: Chronicles of a Liquid Society (2017)

Anthologies

, 236 pages. Ten essays on methods of abductive inference in Poe's Dupin, Doyle's Holmes, Peirce and many others.
, 236 pages. Two essay by U. Eco, medieval texts and commentaries.

ManualCome si fa una tesi di laurea (1977)  – English translation How to Write a Thesis (2015)

Books for children

(Art by Eugenio Carmi)La bomba e il generale (1966, Rev. 1988 - English translation: The Bomb and the General)I tre cosmonauti (1966 - English translation: The Three Astronauts)Gli gnomi di Gnu (1992 - English translation: The Gnomes of Gnu)

 Essays & articles 

 Eternal Fascism: Fourteen Ways of Looking at a Blackshirt (from The New York Review of Books, 22 June 1995) [via Archive.org]
 A paso de cangrejo: artículos, reflexiones y decepciones, 2000-2006'' ('At a Crab's Pace:  Articles, Reflections and Disappointments, 2000-2006') (2007)

 
 
Bibliographies by writer
Bibliographies of Italian writers
Philosophy bibliographies